Lutyens Bungalow Zone or LBZ is the area spread over 2,800-hectare area in Lutyens' Delhi, with bungalows (houses) for government ministers, officials and their administrative offices, since the British Raj. The zone stretches up to Lodhi Road in the south.

History
In order to create development control norms, the Ministry of Urban Development constituted the 'New Delhi Redevelopment Advisory Committee' (NDRAC) in 1972, when the redevelopment of the areas around the walled city, north of Connaught Place and on Prithviraj Road was taken up. Thus the Lutyens Bungalow Zone (LBZ) was first notified in 1988 and later modified in 2003.

References

New Delhi
Tourist attractions in Delhi
Works of Edwin Lutyens in India